The Tour of Good Hope is a multi-day road cycling race that has been held annually in South Africa since 2019. It is part of UCI Africa Tour as a 2.2 event.

Winners

References

External links

Cycle races in South Africa
2019 establishments in South Africa
Recurring sporting events established in 2019
UCI Africa Tour races